Albert Ivan LeBrun (born December 1, 1940) is a Canadian retired professional ice hockey player who played six games in the National Hockey League for the New York Rangers.

External links

1940 births
Canadian ice hockey defencemen
Guelph Royals players
Ice hockey people from Ontario
Living people
New York Rangers players
Sportspeople from Timmins